Oliver Ross McGregor, Baron McGregor of Durris (25 August 1921 – 10 November 1997) was a British sociologist. Born in Durris, Kincardineshire, he married Nell Weate in 1944 and had three sons with her. McGregor was created a life peer on 9 February 1978 taking the title Baron McGregor of Durris, of Hampstead in Greater London.

Academic career
 1945–47 Assistant Lecturer and Lecturer in Economic History, Hull University
 1947–60 Lecturer, Bedford College, London University
 1959–60 Simon Senior Research Fellow, Manchester University
 1960–64 Reader, London University
 1964–85 Professor of Social Institutions, London University
 1964–77  Head of Department of Sociology, Bedford College, London University
 1972–75 Fellow, Wolfson College, Oxford University

Public life
 1975–77 Chairman, Royal Commission on the Press
 1977–? Chairman, Reuters Founders' Share Company
 1980–90 Chairman, Advertising Standards Authority
 1991–94 Chairman, Press Complaints Commission

References

External links
 Obituary: Lord McGregor of Durris, The Independent, 12 November 1997

1921 births
1997 deaths
Academics of Bedford College, London
Crossbench life peers
Fellows of Wolfson College, Oxford
Scottish sociologists
Academics of the University of Hull
Academics of the Victoria University of Manchester
People from Kincardine and Mearns
Royal Artillery soldiers
British Army personnel of World War II
Civil servants in the Ministry of Agriculture, Fisheries and Food
Alumni of the London School of Economics
Life peers created by Elizabeth II